Adventurer at the Door (Pustolov pred vratima) is a 1961 Croatian film directed by Zvonimir Bajsić, starring Zlatko Crnković, Božidar Smiljanić and Fabijan Šovagović. It is based on Milan Begović's play of the same name.

References

External links
 

1961 films
Croatian drama films
1960s Croatian-language films
Yugoslav drama films
Jadran Film films
Croatian films based on plays
Films based on works by Croatian writers
Films set in Zagreb
Films set in Yugoslavia